The 1973–74 Austrian Hockey League season was the 44th season of the Austrian Hockey League, the top level of ice hockey in Austria. Eight teams participated in the league, and EC KAC won the championship.

Regular season

Playoffs

Semifinals

EC KAC - Wiener EV 3:2 (2:3 OT, 5:1, 4:1, 3:4, 10:2)
ECS Innsbruck - ATSE Graz 3:2  (3:2, 2:3, 2:5, 5:4 OT, 5:2)

Final
EC KAC - ECS Innsbruck 3:1 (5:2, 5:2, 3:6, 9:5)

3rd place
ATSE Graz - Wiener EV 2:3 (2:5, 8:3, 4:3, 4:6, 2:3)

External links
Austrian Ice Hockey Association

Austrian Hockey League seasons
Aus
Aust